Blimpliza is the first known Turkish Trip-hop band formed in 2004 by Seda Turan. Band supports various social themes and working with groups of independent activities.<

Band members
 Seda Turan – Singer

Discography
 Alenen (2009)
 Particles (2011)
 Sessions (2015)

References

External links
blimpliza official page
blimpliza on spotify
blimpliza on Myspace
blimpliza on Last.fm

Turkish musical groups
Musical groups established in 2004